Saghand (also Romanized as Sāghand; also known as Sagand and Sāqand) is a village in Rabatat Rural District, Kharanaq District, Ardakan County, Yazd Province, Iran. At the 2006 census, its population was 190, in 59 families.

References 

Populated places in Ardakan County